Guido Leoni (July 14, 1915 - May 6, 1951) was an Italian Grand Prix motorcycle road racer. He won the 1951 125cc Spanish Grand Prix riding for the Mondial factory racing team. One month later, while competing in a race in Ferrara, Leoni was involved in a multiple-bike accident and was killed. He was posthumously awarded fifth place in the 1951 125cc world championship.

References 

1915 births
1951 deaths
Italian motorcycle racers
125cc World Championship riders
500cc World Championship riders
Motorcycle racers who died while racing
Sport deaths in Italy